Proclamation of Independence Day is a national holiday and a celebration to commemorate East Timor Unilateral Declaration of Independence from the Portuguese rule in 1975. The event is annually celebrated on 28th November and marked by official and unofficial ceremonies and observances. The event is defined by East Timor parliament in the Law No. 10/2005 Of 10 August as part of its national holiday.

History
A year after the April 25 Revolution, Portugal consecrated freedom to its overseas provinces. Under conditions of destabilization, propaganda and military pressure from Indonesia, Fretilin finally proclaimed the independence of the Democratic Republic of East Timor on 28 November 1975 with Xavier do Amaral as President and Nicolau Lobato as Prime Minister. 

A few days after the proclamation, UDT and three other smaller parties announced the 'Balibo Declaration' - a call calling for the Indonesian government to annex Timor. Even though it is called the Balibo Declaration, witnesses who signed it testified that the draft declaration was drafted in Jakarta and signed at a hotel in Bali under conditions of coercion as recorded in the report of the Commission for Reception, Truth and Reconciliation for Timor-Leste (CAVR) in 2005. 

With that proclamation also came a civil war. To combat this force, the East Timorese resistance creates the Revolutionary Front of Independent Timor-Leste (FRETILIN).  The fighting between Fretilin and its military wing took place in the interior, the Armed Forces for the National Liberation of Timor-Leste (Falintil). 

Nine days later, Indonesia invaded East Timor on 7 December 1975. Indonesia decided to invade Timorese territory under the pretext of defending citizens of Indonesian ethnicity. The attack allowed Indonesia to successfully occupy Timor for 24 years.

Unilateral Declaration of Independence
East Timor; under FRETILIN rule, unilaterally declared its independence on 28 November 1975. This following text of proclamation is written on a memorial monument built to commemorate the 1975 Government of East Timor:

In Portuguese:

In English:

Observance
The Proclamation of Independence Day had been made as the national holiday in East Timor from 2005.

The event annually celebrated with ceremony attended by the government of East Timor, it's celebrated with a flag rising ceremony and the singing of the national anthem, the Military of East Timor also performed military parade in the country. Students, civil servants and state agents, are required to participate in the celebrations and commemorative ceremonies of the Proclamation of Independence Day taking place in public services or teaching establishments, whether public or private.

References

Observances in East Timor
November observances